1970 college football season may refer to:

 1970 NCAA University Division football season
 1970 NCAA College Division football season
 1970 NAIA Division I football season
 1970 NAIA Division II football season